El Camino is the 13th and last studio album by Argentine rock band Vox Dei, released in 2005.

Details
It is the band's second album with guitarist Carlos Gardellini and its first release on the band's independent label, La Rompe Records. 
It is also Vox Dei's seventh line-up second full-length appearance since 1994, following the departure of Ricardo Soulé in 1998. 
The band presented and announced the new album on 22 July 2005, at the ND Ateneo Theatre (Buenos Aires), three months before they ended the recording. 
Also, Vox Dei remade six songs from previous albums (including the studio version of "Torcazas y Pinos", from El Regreso de la Leyenda).

Track listing
All songs written by Willy Quiroga except where noted.

"El Camino"
"Tito"
"Soltando Lastre"
"No Quiero Dormir" (Carlos Gardellini, Willy Quiroga)
"Ahora Es el Preciso Instante"
"Carrera Loca" (Carlos Gardellini, Rubén Basoalto)
"Compulsión"
"Esta Canción"
"Torcazas y Pinos"
"Un Corazón Dispuesto"
"Tan Sólo un Hombre"
"Río de Blues" (Ricardo Soulé, Willy Quiroga)
"Medley: Jeremías, Pies de Plomo / El Regreso del Dr. Jeckill" (Ricardo Soulé, Willy Quiroga)
"Hidden track"

Credits
Vox Dei
Willy Quiroga - Bass, Keyboards and Vocals.
Carlos Gardellini - Lead Guitar and Backing vocals.
Rubén Basoalto - Drums, Percussion and Vocals.
Simon Quiroga - Keyboards.

References

External links
Vox Dei's official webpage 
Vox Dei discography 

Vox Dei albums
2005 albums